The 2019–20 Wyoming Cowgirls basketball team will represent the University of Wyoming in the 2019–20 college basketball season. The Cowgirls are led by first-year head coach Gerald Mattinson, hired following the retirement of longtime coach Joe Legerski. The Cowgirls will play their home games at the Arena-Auditorium and are members of the Mountain West Conference.

Previous season
The Cowgirls finished the 2018–19 season 25–9, 13–5 in Mountain West play to finish in third place. They defeated Utah State and San Diego State in the Mountain West tournament before losing to Boise State in the championship game. They advanced to the quarterfinals of the WNIT before losing to the eventual champion, Arizona. Longtime head coach Joe Legerski retired at the end of the season after 16 years as head coach.

Offseason
Wyoming was picked to finish fourth in the Mountain West Conference by coaches and media.

Roster

Statistics

Schedule

|-
!colspan=9 style=| Exhibition

|-
!colspan=9 style=| Non-Conference regular season

|-
!colspan=9 style=| Mountain West regular season

|-
!colspan=9 style="background:#492f24; color:#ffc425;"| Mountain West Women's Tournament

See also
 2019–20 Wyoming Cowboys basketball team

References

Wyoming Cowgirls basketball seasons
Wyoming
Wyoming Cowgirls
Wyoming Cowgirls